Wyomia Tyus (pronunciation: why-o-mi; born August 29, 1945) is a retired American track and field sprinter, and the first person to retain the Olympic title in the 100 m (a feat since duplicated by Carl Lewis, Gail Devers, Shelly-Ann Fraser-Pryce, Usain Bolt, and Elaine Thompson-Herah).

Early life 
Raised on a dairy farm, as the youngest of four children, and the only girl in the family Tyus was encouraged by her father to participate in sports. While a high school athlete Tyus participated in basketball and began her track endeavors as a high jumper before transitioning to the sprints after being invited to a summer track clinic at Tennessee State University in 1960. It was in this same year that Tyus's father died leaving the job of male role model in Tyus's life to her soon to be track coach at Tennessee State Ed Temple.

College and professional career 
Tyus, from Tennessee State University, participated in the 1964 Summer Olympics at age 19. In the heats of the event, she equaled Wilma Rudolph's world record, propelling her to a favored position for the final, where her main rival was fellow American Edith McGuire. Tyus won the final, beating McGuire by 0.2 seconds. At the same Olympics, she also won a silver medal with the 4 × 100 m relay team.

The following years, Tyus won numerous national championships in the sprint events, and a gold medal in the 200 m at the Pan-American Games. In 1968, she returned to the Olympics to defend her title in the 100 m. In the final, she set a new world record of 11.08 s to become the first person, male or female, to retain the Olympic 100 metres title. Tyus also qualified for the 200 m final, in which she finished sixth. Running the final leg for the relay team, Tyus helped setting a new world record, winning her third gold medal.

Director Bud Greenspan filmed Tyus casually dancing behind her starting blocks before the Olympic final.  When interviewed later she said she was doing the "Tighten Up" to stay loose.

Tyus retired from amateur sports after the 1968 Olympics. In 1973 she was invited to compete in the 60-yard dash in the new Professional International Track Association competitions. In her first-year return, she won eight of eighteen events. The following year, she won every event she entered, a total of twenty-two races. Tyus continued to compete in the 60 yard dash up until 1982.

Post athletics 
Tyus went on to coach at Beverly Hills High School, and was a founding member of the Women's Sports Foundation.

During the Richard Dawson era of Family Feud, Tyus appeared with her family (1980). They won the $5,000 prize. In 1976 Tyus was inducted into the Georgia Sports Hall of Fame. In 1980, Tyus was inducted into the National Track and Field Hall of Fame. At the 1984 Summer Olympics, she was one of eleven athletes who carried in the Olympic Flag during the Opening Ceremony. In 1985, she was inducted into the U.S. Olympic Hall of Fame.

In 1999 her hometown Griffin, Georgia honored her with the unveiling of the Wyomia Tyus Olympic Park. The 2010 Breeder's World Cup featured a two-year-old filly racing horse bearing her namesake. In 2018 she published the memoir Tigerbelle : the Wyomia Tyus story, with co-author Elizabeth Terzakis; it is part of Dave Zirin's Edge of Sports series.

Personal life 
Tyus grew up in a primarily white neighborhood and became aware of her race and of racial segregation at an early age. She was forced to take an hour bus ride to school each day, in spite of the fact that there was a white school within walking distance. Racial divide in her neighborhood also prevented Tyus from playing with the white girls that lived nearby and as the nearest black family lived almost a mile away, Tyus spent most of her time playing sports with her brothers and the white boys in the neighborhood. As she grew older her father helped to solidify the idea that she could accomplish anything in her life, but not without hard work to overcome racial stigma.

After finishing high school Tyus attended Tennessee State University (TSU), making her the first of her family to go to college. While at TSU Tyus participated in the Tigerbelles collegiate team. Tyus began training with TSU coach Ed Temple, however poor grades, study habits, and a general lack of interest in her classes nearly derailed her chances to continue her training and attend the 1964 Olympics. She has credited her training with Coach Temple as helping with her development and success in her sports, academic, and professional life, especially as he highlighted the struggle that comes with being a black athlete and having to work harder to receive positive recognition.

In December 1968 Tyus moved with her then boyfriend from Georgia to California, where she worked as a substitute teacher. She married her boyfriend Art Simburg in 1969 and held multiple jobs until becoming a teacher in 1971. Tyus left this job within a year in order to stay at home with her first child. Tyus's first marriage ended in 1974 and in 1978 she married Duane Tillman, with whom she had her second child, a son.

References

Further reading

External links
Tigerbelles Olympic Tradition

1968 Olympic Funky dance
Wyomia Tyus Olympic Park

1945 births
Living people
People from Griffin, Georgia
Track and field athletes from Georgia (U.S. state)
Track and field athletes from California
American female sprinters
African-American female track and field athletes
Olympic gold medalists for the United States in track and field
Olympic silver medalists for the United States in track and field
Athletes (track and field) at the 1964 Summer Olympics
Athletes (track and field) at the 1968 Summer Olympics
Pan American Games medalists in athletics (track and field)
Pan American Games gold medalists for the United States
Athletes (track and field) at the 1967 Pan American Games
Tennessee State Lady Tigers track and field athletes
Contestants on American game shows
Medalists at the 1968 Summer Olympics
Medalists at the 1964 Summer Olympics
USA Outdoor Track and Field Championships winners
USA Indoor Track and Field Championships winners
Medalists at the 1967 Pan American Games
Olympic female sprinters
21st-century African-American people
21st-century African-American women
20th-century African-American sportspeople
20th-century African-American women